Jhon Serna is a Colombian weightlifter. He represented Colombia at the 2019 World Weightlifting Championships, as well as the 2019 Pan American Championships.

References 

Living people
1994 births
Colombian male weightlifters
21st-century Colombian people
20th-century Colombian people